Sir John Douglas Waite (born 3 July 1932) is an English barrister and former Lord Justice of Appeal.  Sir John was also the former Chair of the Independent Asylum Commission.

Sir John Waite was educated at Sherborne School and Corpus Christi College, Cambridge, and was President of the Cambridge Union in 1955.
 After National Service in the Royal Artillery, he was called to the bar (Gray's Inn) in 1956. He took silk in 1975.

Waite was appointed to the High Court of Justice in 1982, receiving the customary knighthood. He sat in the Family Division of the High Court until 1993, when he was promoted to the Court of Appeal, and was sworn of the Privy Council. He retired in 1997.

References

1932 births
Living people
Alumni of Corpus Christi College, Cambridge
20th-century English judges
Lords Justices of Appeal
Knights Bachelor
Members of the Privy Council of the United Kingdom
English King's Counsel
20th-century King's Counsel
Presidents of the Cambridge Union
Royal Artillery officers
Members of Gray's Inn
Family Division judges
People educated at Sherborne School